Abigail is a female given name. The name comes from the Hebrew name אֲבִיגַיִל / אֲבִיגָיִל Avigail, meaning "my father's joy" (alternatively "my father is exulted" or "my father is joyful", among others). It is also a surname.

The name can be shortened to "Abbey", "Abby", "Abbi", "Abbie", "Abi", "Abs", or "Aby", as well as "Gail", "Gayle", among others.

Biblical name

Abigail was the wife of King David in the Hebrew Bible's Book of Samuel, and is described as an intelligent, beautiful, loyal woman.
Abigail was the mother of Amasa, the commander-in-chief of Absalom's army (2 Samuel 17:25).

Translations 
 Arabic: ابيجايل "Abigail" (Egypt) ابيغيل "Abighail"  (other Arab countries).
 Bengali: এবিগেল (Ēbigēla)
 Biblical Greek: Abigaia
 Biblical Hebrew: אביגיל
 Bulgarian: Абигейл
 Catalan: Abigail
 Cantonese: 阿比基爾 (aa3 bei5 gei1 ji5)
 Chinese Simplified: 阿比盖尔 (Ā bǐ gài ěr)
 Chinese Traditional:艾比蓋兒
 Danish: Abigail, Abigael
 Dutch: Abigail, Abigaïl
 Fijian:Apikali
 French: Abigaïl, Abigaël
 German: Abigail
 Gujarati: એબીગેઇલ (Ēbīgē'ila)
 Haitian Creole: Abigayèl
 Hawaiian: Apikalia, ʻApikaʻila
 Hebrew: אביגיל, Avigail / Abigail, אֲבִיגָיִל (ʾĂḇîḡáyil) 
 Hindi: सेविका (Sēvikā)
 Hungarian: Abigél
 Irish: Abigeál
 Italian: Abigaille
 Japanese: アビゲイル (Abigeiru)
 Korean: 애비게일 (Aebigeil)
 Macedonian: Авигеја (Avigeja)
 Maori: Apikaira
 Mongolian: Ивээл (ᠢᠪᠡᠭᠡᠯ)
 Nepali: अबीगेलले (Abīgēlalē)
 Persian: آبیگل - ابیگیل -  ابیگل
 Portuguese: Abigail
 Punjabi: ਅਬੀਗੈਲ (Abīgaila)
 Russian:  (Avigeya); used predominantly in biblical contexts
 Serbian: Абигејл (Abigejl) but in biblical context Ависага (Avisaga) is used
 Somali: Abiigayil
 Spanish: Abigaíl
 Swahili: Abigaeli
 Swedish: Abigail
 Ukrainian: Абіґейл
 Urdu: ابیگیل
 Yiddish: אַביגאַיל
 Yoruba: Ábígẹlì

People with the given name
 Abigail Adams née Smith (1744–1818), First Lady of the United States to President John Adams
 Abigail Binay (born 1975), Filipina politician
 Abigail Breslin (born 1996), American actress
 Abbey Clancy (born 1986), English model
 Abigail Conceição de Souza (1921–2007), Brazilian footballer
 Abbie Cornish (born 1982), Australian actress
 Abigail Cowen (born 1998), American actress
 Abigail Cruttenden (born 1969), English television actress
 Abby Dahlkemper (born 1993), American soccer player
 Abigail Fillmore née Powers (1798–1853), First Lady of the United States to President Millard Fillmore
 Abigail Folger (1943–1969), American heiress and murder victim
 Abigail Glen (born 2001), English cricketer
 Annette Abigael Hamilton (1806–1879), Norwegian author and fairy-tale collector
 Abigail and Brittany Hensel (born 1990), American conjoined twins
 Abigail Franks (c. 1696–1756), Colonial-era New York City Jewish woman and letter writer
 Abigael González Valencia (born 1972), Mexican suspected drug lord
 Abigail Campbell Kawānanakoa (1882–1945), Hawaiian princess
 Abigail Kapiolani Kawānanakoa (1903–1961), Hawaiian princess
 Abigail Kinoiki Kekaulike Kawānanakoa (1926–2022), Hawaiian princess
 Abigail Maheha (1832–1861), Hawaiian princess
 Abigail Masham, Baroness Masham (c.1670–1734), British baroness
 Abigail Paduch (born 2000), Australian judoka
 Abigail (actress), aka Abigail Rogan (born 1946), Australian actress
 Abigail Rogers, (1818–1869) American advocate for women's rights and women's education
 Abigail Seldin (born 1988), American edtech entrepreneur
 Abigail Adams Smith (1765–1813), first-born child of John Adams, the former President of the United States
 Abigail Spanberger (born 1979), American politician
 Abigail Spears (born 1981), American tennis player
 Abigail Spencer (born 1981), American actress
 Abigail Swann, American atmospheric scientist and ecologist
 Abigael Tarus (born 1981), Kenyan volleyball player
 Abigail Thorn (born 1993), British actress and YouTuber who runs the channel "Philosophy Tube"
 Abi Titmuss (born 1976), British actress
 Abigail Goodrich Whittelsey (1788–1858), American educator, publisher, editor
 Abigail Williams (Salem witch trials) (1680–c.1697), a primary accuser in the Salem witch trials; portrayed in the Arthur Miller play The Crucible

Used as a pseudonym:
 Abigail Van Buren, pen name of Pauline Philips, pseudonymous author of the Dear Abby column

Fictional characters 
 Abigaëlle, a character from the 2014 film Abigaëlle
 Abigail, a character in the Acts of Faith trilogy by T. Davis Bunn and Janette Oke, wife of Stephen (St. Stephen)
 Abigail, a boss villain character in the Final Fight series, and most recently a playable character in Street Fighter V.
 Abby, a 12-year-old vampire character in the 2010 film Let Me In
 Abigaille, a character in Giuseppe Verdi's opera Nabucco
 Abigail, one of the characters available for marriage in farming simulation role-playing video game Stardew Valley
 Dark Priest Abigail, in the Bastard!! Japanese manga/anime series
 Mother Abagail, the personification of good in Stephen King's novel The Stand
 Princess Abigail, the haughty daughter of King Midas on the ABC television series, Once Upon A Time
 Abigail the Breeze Fairy, a character from the Rainbow Magic book franchise
 Abigail Anderson (aka Abby or Abs), playable character in Naughty Dog's videogame The Last of Us Part II
 Abby Archer, the main protagonist in the Canadian animated television series Grossology
 Abbey Bartlet, the First Lady of the United States in the television drama The West Wing
 Abigail Bird, a supporting character in the 1976–2000 American comic strip Motley's Crew
 Abigail Brand, Special Agent, commanding officer of S.W.O.R.D., that deals with defending the Earth from extraterrestrial threats
 Abi Branning, in the BBC soap opera EastEnders
 Abigail Callaghan, a minor character from the 2014 Disney 3D computer-animated film Big Hero 6
 Abigail Chase in National Treasure film franchise
 Abigail Deveraux, student in the NBC soap opera Days of Our Lives
 Abigail Dixon, a student in the Australian mockumentary Summer Heights High
 Abby Hammond, daughter character in the television series Santa Clarita Diet
 Abby Hatcher, the eponymous protagonist in the Nick Jr. animated television series Abby Hatcher
 Abby Holland, DC Comics character
 Abigail Lincoln (aka Numbuh 5), a female black character from the Cartoon Network animated television series Codename: Kids Next Door
 Abby Lockhart, medical doctor in the television drama ER
 Abby Maitland, zoologist in the British television series Primeval
 Abigail Mills, character in Sleepy Hollow (TV series)
 Abigail Roberts, the name of John Marston's wife in Red Dead Redemption and RDR 2
 Abby Sciuto, forensic scientist in the television drama NCIS
 Abigail Stevenson, in The Baby-sitters Club children's book series by Ann Martin
 Abigail Stone, a supporting Jewish character from the 2021 animated film Spirit Untamed
 Abigail Jane Stewart in Kristiana Gregory's The Winter of Red Snow: The Revolutionary War Diary of Abigail Jane Stewart
 Abigail Stock, a supporting character in the British television series Skins
 Abigail Trant, a character from the 1991 film The Man in the Moon
 Abigail Williams, character in the CBS soap opera As the World Turns
 Abigail Zenobia, a daughter of Valentine Michael Smith and Anne in the 1961 science fiction novel Stranger in a Strange Land
 Abigail Bellweather, a character from the TV series Motherland: Fort Salem
 Abigail Pershing, formerly known as Abagail Merriwick, is a main character in the Hallmark Channel original series The Good Witch

People with the surname 
 Francis Abigail (1840–1921), Australian politician
 Peter Abigail (born 1948), Australian army officer
 Robert Abigail (born 1980), Dutch DJ

See also 

 Gilla (disambiguation)
 Avigayil, an Israeli settlement

References

Notes

Sources 
 А. В. Суперанская (A. V. Superanskaya). "Современный словарь личных имён: Сравнение. Происхождение. Написание" (Modern Dictionary of First Names: Comparison. Origins. Spelling). Айрис-пресс. Москва, 2005. 

Feminine given names
English feminine given names
Hebrew feminine given names
Jewish given names